Ryan Martin may refer to:

 Ryan Martin (boxer) (born 1993), American lightweight boxer
 Ryan Martin (athlete) (born 1989), American middle distance runner
 Ryan Martin (footballer) (born 1993), Samoan footballer
 Ryan Martin (ballet) (born 1973), American ballet dancer, ballet teacher and artistic director
 Ryan Martin (soccer coach), American soccer coach
 Ryan Martin, bassist with Smile Empty Soul